In music, the BACH motif is the motif, a succession of notes important or characteristic to a piece, B flat, A, C, B natural. In German musical nomenclature, in which the note B natural is named H and the B flat named B, it forms Johann Sebastian Bach's family name. One of the most frequently occurring examples of a musical cryptogram, the motif has been used by countless composers, especially after the Bach Revival in the first half of the 19th century.

Origin
Johann Gottfried Walther's Musicalisches Lexikon (1732) contains the only biographical sketch of Johann Sebastian Bach published during the composer's lifetime. There the motif is mentioned thus:This reference work thus indicates Bach as the inventor of the motif.

Usage in compositions
In a comprehensive study published in the catalogue for the 1985 exhibition "300 Jahre Johann Sebastian Bach" ("300 years of Johann Sebastian Bach") in Stuttgart, Germany, Ulrich Prinz lists 409 works by 330 composers from the 17th to the 20th century using the BACH motif. A similar list is available in Malcolm Boyd's volume on Bach: it also contains some 400 works.

Johann Sebastian Bach
Johann Sebastian Bach used the motif in a number of works, most famously as a fugue subject in the last Contrapunctus of The Art of Fugue. The motif also appears in other pieces. Later commentators wrote: "The figure occurs so often in Bach's bass lines that it cannot have been accidental."

Instances of B–A–C–H appearing in Johann Sebastian Bach's compositions and arrangements:
 Fugue from his BWV 898
 Brandenburg Concerto No. 2, BWV 1047 (the continuo part at bar 109)
 Gigue from his English Suite No. 6 for keyboard
 The subject of the Sinfonia in F minor BWV 795 "incorporates" a version of the motif. This five-note version appears transposed: a'–g' (rest) g'–b'–a'. Eventually, in measure 17, the piece makes its way to a passage in which the five-note version of the motif starts on B: as B–A–(rest)–A–C–H.
 His arrangement of a motet for SSATB singers

 Near the end of the Augmentation Canon of Bach's Canonic Variations on "Vom Himmel hoch da komm' ich her", BWV 769:

 Near the end of Contrapunctus IV of The Art of Fugue:

 As first four notes of the third and last subject of the final unfinished fugue of The Art of Fugue:

Hans Heinrich Eggebrecht goes as far as to reconstruct Bach's putative intentions as an expression of Lutheran thought, imagining Bach to be saying, "I am identified with the tonic and it is my desire to reach it ... Like you I am human. I am in need of salvation; I am certain in the hope of salvation, and have been saved by grace," through his use of the motif rather than a standard changing tone figure (B–A–C–B) in the final measures of the fourth fugue of The Art of Fugue.

Other composers

The motif was used as a fugue subject by Bach's son Johann Christian, and by his pupil Johann Ludwig Krebs. It also appears in a work by Georg Philipp Telemann.

The motif's wide popularity came only after the start of the Bach Revival in the first half of the 19th century. A few mid-19th century works that feature the motif prominently are:
1845 – Robert Schumann: Sechs Fugen über den Namen: Bach, for organ, pedal piano, or harmonium, Op. 60
1855 – Franz Liszt: Fantasy and Fugue on the Theme B-A-C-H, for organ (later revised, 1870, and arranged, 1871, for piano)  
1856 – Johannes Brahms: Fugue in A-flat minor for organ, WoO 8
1878 – Nicolai Rimsky-Korsakov –   
Composers found that the motif could be easily incorporated not only into the advanced harmonic writing of the 19th century, but also into the totally chromatic idiom of the Second Viennese School; so it was used by Arnold Schoenberg, Anton Webern, and their disciples and followers. A few 20th-century works that feature the motif prominently are:
1926–28 – Arnold Schoenberg: Variations for Orchestra, Op. 31
1937–38 – Anton Webern: String Quartet (the tone row is based on the BACH motif)
1942 - Charles Koechlin: Offrande musicale sur le nom de Bach, Op.187
 1951–55 – Luigi Dallapiccola:
 1951–55: "Canti di liberazione"
 1952: Quaderno musicale di Annalibera for piano 
 1954: Variazioni ("Variations" 1942, orchestral version of Quaderno musicale di Annalibera)
1966 – Krzysztof Penderecki: St Luke Passion
 1968–81 – Alfred Schnittke:
1968: Quasi Una Sonata (repeated motif, one reviewer, "noting that B–A–C–H is the victor of the composition")
1981: Symphony No. 3 – used alongside the monograms of several other composers.
1974 – Jon Lord and Eberhard Schoener: Continuo On B.A.C.H. on the album Windows
1992 – Ron Nelson: Passacaglia (Homage on B–A–C–H) for wind ensemble

In the 21st century, composers continue writing works using the motif, frequently in homage to Johann Sebastian Bach.

References

Sources
 
 
 
 
 
 Orledge, Robert.  Charles Koechlin (1867-1950) His Life and Works.  Harwood Academic Publishers pp. 197-198.  ISBN 3-7186-0609-7.

Further reading
 Seyoung Jeong (2009). Four Modern Piano Compositions Incorporating the B–A–C–H Motive. .
 Schuyler Watrous Robinson (1972). The B–A–C–H Motive in German Keyboard Compositions from the Time of J.S. Bach to the Present (thesis, University of Illinois)

External links

 

Motifs (music)
Melodic sections
Johann Sebastian Bach